Dutch Flat or Dutch Flats may refer to:

 Dutch Flat, California, an unincorporated community in northern California
 Dutch Flat (Arizona), a valley in Arizona
 Dutch Flats Airport, a historic airfield in San Diego, California